Lincoln Park was a noted amusement park in New Orleans, Louisiana from 1902 to 1930. It was located in the city's Gert Town section, on the downtown side of Carrollton Avenue between Olive and Forshay Streets (near where Earhart Boulevard intersects Carrollton Ave now). It was devoted to amusements for the city's African American population.

History 
Lincoln Park was created in May, 1902 when the Standard Brewing Company bought the site from Yazoo and Mississippi River Railroad Company.  The  New Orleans City Council had already given permission to the brewing company to make a private park on the property if they purchased the land. The Standard Brewing Company fenced in the park, built a large pavilion dance hall behind the Carrollton Avenue entrance, and charged 15 cents for entrance. For several years in the first decade of the 1900s the adjacent block across Short Street was "Johnson Park".

Entertainment 
Lincoln Park contained a skating rink, and featured hot air balloon ascensions on weekends. Other entertainment included prize fighting and vaudeville shows.

Early jazz musicians such as Buddy Bolden, Bunk Johnson, Freddie Keppard were heard there, and John Robichaux's Orchestra was a regular feature.

References

Amusement parks in New Orleans
20th century in New Orleans
Defunct amusement parks in the United States
1902 establishments in Louisiana
1930 disestablishments in Louisiana